The 2023 Six Nations Under 20s Championship  was the 16th Six Nations Under 20s Championship, the annual northern hemisphere rugby union championship for players under 20 years of age. Ireland retained the championship, their fifth, winning all five matches as they had done in the last tournament to record a fourth Grand Slam.

Participants

Table 

Table ranking rules

 Four match points are awarded for a win.
 Two match points are awarded for a draw.
 A bonus match point is awarded to a team that scores four or more tries in a match or loses a match by seven points or fewer. If a team scores four tries in a match and loses by seven points or fewer, they are awarded both bonus points.
 Three bonus match points are awarded to a team that wins all five of their matches (known as a Grand Slam). This ensures that a Grand Slam winning team reaches a minimum of 23 points, and thus always ranks over a team who won four matches in which they also were awarded four try bonus points and were also awarded two bonus points (a try bonus and a losing bonus) in the match that they lost for a total of 22 points.
 Tie-breakers
 If two or more teams are tied on match points, the team with the better points difference (points scored less points conceded) is ranked higher.
 If the above tie-breaker fails to separate tied teams, the team that scored the higher number of total tries in their matches is ranked higher.
 If two or more teams remain tied for first place at the end of the championship after applying the above tiebreakers, the title is shared between them.

Fixtures

Week 1

Week 2

Week 3

Week 4

Week 5

References

External links 

 Under-20 Six Nations

2023
2023 rugby union tournaments for national teams
2022–23 in English rugby union
2022–23 in French rugby union
2022–23 in Irish rugby union
2022–23 in Italian rugby union
2022–23 in Scottish rugby union
2022–23 in Welsh rugby union
Under 20
February 2023 sports events in the United Kingdom
March 2023 sports events in the United Kingdom